The Rueylong Museum is a natural history museum in Qionglin Township, Hsinchu County, Taiwan.

Transportation
The museum is accessible within walking distance east from Shangyuan Station of the Taiwan Railways.

See also
 List of museums in Taiwan

References

1985 establishments in Taiwan
Museums established in 1985
Museums in Hsinchu County
Natural history museums in Taiwan